Senlin Gongyuan Nanmen (Forest Park South Gate) station is a station on Line 8 of the Beijing Subway. It is located at the south entrance to the Olympic Forest Park.

Around the station
 China Science and Technology Museum
 Olympic Forest Park

Station layout 
The station has an underground island platform.

Exits 
There are 4 exits, lettered A, B, C, and D. Exit D is accessible.

References

External links

Beijing Subway stations in Chaoyang District
Railway stations in China opened in 2008